Robert Gordon Rogers,  (August 19, 1919 – May 21, 2010) was the 24th Lieutenant Governor of British Columbia from 1983 to 1988.

Born in Montreal, he was a graduate of the University of Toronto Schools, the University of Toronto, and the Royal Military College of Canada in Kingston. During the Second World War, he served with the 1st Hussars of the Royal Canadian Armoured Corps, landing on Juno Beach on D-Day in 1944.

From 1991 to 1996, he served as Chancellor of the University of Victoria.

In 1989, he was made an Officer of the Order of Canada. In 1990, he was awarded the Order of British Columbia.

Rogers died on May 21, 2010.

References

1919 births
2010 deaths
People from Montreal
Anglophone Quebec people
Canadian military personnel of World War II
Lieutenant Governors of British Columbia
Canadian university and college chancellors
Officers of the Order of Canada
Members of the Order of British Columbia
Canadian Anglicans
Royal Military College of Canada alumni
University of Toronto alumni